Nigina Abduraimova was the defending champion, having won the event in 2013. She successfully defended her title by defeating Nao Hibino in the final, 6–3, 6–4

Seeds

Main draw

Finals

Top half

Bottom half

References 
 Main draw

Fergana Challenger - Women's Singles
Fergana Challenger